Susan Goethel Campbell (born 1956) is an American book artist known for her mixed media works that explore aspects of the natural environment. She often uses nontraditional materials in order to encourage viewers to reconsider their definition of a book.
 
Campbell was born in Grand Rapids, Michigan. She currently lives in Ferndale, Michigan. Her work is included in the collections of the National Museum of Women in the Arts, the McNay Art Museum and the Detroit Institute of Arts.

References

20th-century American women artists
1956 births
Living people
20th-century American artists
21st-century American women artists
21st-century American artists
Mixed-media artists
Artists from Grand Rapids, Michigan